The 1944–45 Duke Blue Devils men's basketball team represented Duke University during the 1944–45 men's college basketball season. The head coach was Gerry Gerard, coaching his third season with the Blue Devils. The team finished with an overall record of 13–9.

References 

Duke Blue Devils men's basketball seasons
Duke
1944 in sports in North Carolina
1945 in sports in North Carolina